Nicola Pozzi (born 30 June 1986) is an Italian football coach and former striker.

Playing career

Milan
Signed by A.C. Milan from then-Serie C1 side Cesena in January 2004, he was successively loaned to Napoli and Pescara, before being sent on loan to Empoli F.C. for two consecutive seasons (2005–06 and 2006–07).

Empoli
In 2007–08 season, his status was changed to co-owned by both sides, for €750,000 (that season Empoli also signed Luca Antonini (€1 million), Lino Marzoratti (€750,000) and Ignazio Abate (€900,000) in co-ownership deals), and on 16 June 2008 Empoli got full ownership for €3.25 million (Pozzi) and €1.5 million (Marzoratti ) in exchange of Antonini (€2.75 million) and Abate (€2 million) who returned to AC Milan, effectively made Empoli pay €3.4 million in net for Pozzi and Marzoratti, as well as the special loan of Abate and Antonini.

On 9 December 2007, he scored all four goals in Empoli's 4–1 victory over Cagliari. However, he suffered a season-ending knee injury after netting a brace in a 3–1 defeat of Napoli on February 17, and was sidelined for six months, effectively ruling him out of the Azzurrini squad for the 2008 Olympics.

Pozzi also represented Italy at the Under-21 level.

Sampdoria
On 31 August 2009 Sampdoria announced via their website the loan signing of Pozzi for €180,000 with the option to make the signing permanent. In June 2010, Sampdoria decided to sign him outright, for €5.2 million on a five-year contract.

Parma
After playing five seasons well at Sampdoria, Pozzi moved to Serie A side Parma on 31 January 2014, with Stefano Okaka moving in the opposite direction,  The deal was a cashless swap, as both Pozzi and Okaka were valued for €2 million.

On 2 February 2015, Pozzi joined A.C. Chievo Verona in a temporary deal.

Vicenza
On 31 August 2015, he was signed by Vicenza in a two-year deal. He took no.9 shirt from Stefano Pettinari.

However, on 25 August 2016 he was released.

Coaching career
On 26 June 2021, Pozzi took on his first head coaching role, being appointed at the helm of Tuscan Eccellenza amateur club Grassina. He left the club in June 2022, after suffering relegation to Promozione.

References

External links
FIGC 

Living people
1986 births
Sportspeople from the Province of Rimini
Association football forwards
Italian footballers
Empoli F.C. players
A.C. Milan players
A.C. Cesena players
S.S.C. Napoli players
Delfino Pescara 1936 players
U.C. Sampdoria players
Parma Calcio 1913 players
A.C. ChievoVerona players
San Donato Tavarnelle players
Italy under-21 international footballers
Serie A players
Serie B players
Serie C players
Serie D players
Footballers from Emilia-Romagna
Italian football managers